Mayfield City School District is a public school district in Cuyahoga County, Ohio. The district serves four communities in the Greater Cleveland area, which previously comprised Mayfield Township: Gates Mills, Highland Heights, Mayfield Heights, and Mayfield Village.

The district's six schools are Mayfield High School; Mayfield Middle School; and Center, Gates Mills, Lander and Millridge elementary schools. The district also operates consortium programs for students from neighboring school districts, including the Cuyahoga East Vocational Education Consortium (CEVEC) and Excel TECC, which provide occupational and technical training.

References

External links

 Mayfield City School District

School districts in Cuyahoga County, Ohio
Mayfield Heights, Ohio